Acacia stenophylla is a species of Acacia commonly referred to as the shoestring acacia. It is an evergreen tree in the family Fabaceae native to Australia. It is not considered rare or endangered.

Description
Acacia stenophylla varies in characteristic and size, from a rounded, multi stemmed shrub to a spreading tree. Bark is dark-grey to blackish and rough, branchlets are smooth to sericeous and sometimes angular.

Veins are copious and closely parallel.

Flowers are 5-merous, sepals three-quarters united.

Flowering time is often irregular, although mainly occurring in autumn.

Acacia stenophylla is highly salt tolerant and moderately frost and drought tolerant.

Distribution 
Acacia stenophylla is predominantly distributed in central and eastern Australia. It is also found infrequently in arid regions of Western Australia and towards the southern end of the western coast, although very rarely.

A. stenophylla is found from the Murray River in South Australia and Victoria to western New South Wales, Northern Territory, Queensland, with a small population also occurring in Western Australia.

Latitude - Main occurrence: 23–33°S

Range: 17–36°S 

Altitude - Main occurrence: 50–325 m

Range: near sea level to 625 m

Ecology

Climate 
Acacia stenophylla is most commonly found in a warm arid climatic zone. Acacia stenophylla tends to grow to a larger size in semi-arid climates which exist in New South Wales and Queensland. The species also expands into the sub-humid zone in Queensland.

Disregarding the species far southern distribution, the mean maximum temperature of the warmest month is 35–38 °C and the mean minimum of the coolest month 4–7 °C. There are, on average, about 110–130 days per year over 32 °C and 15–50 days over 38 °C.

Acacia stenphylla is subject to experiencing 1–20 heavy frosts per year, on average. The species withstands a variable range of rainfall frequency. Rainfall is often amplified by groundwater or periodic flooding.

Physiography and soils 
Acacia stenophylla is common throughout the Interior Lowlands physiographic division. It is often present on plains and gentle slopes and is common on the banks of watercourses, river flood plains, and depressions. The soils are predominantly fine-textured alluvials, red sandy clay and grey cracking clays. Soils often have a high pH and may be more saline in the lower horizons.

Vegetation type 
Acacia stenophylla occurs in ribbon-like stands along watercourses, often as a part of eucalyptus dominated open-forest, woodland or low woodland.  The species can be present in the understorey, often with Acacia salicina and Acacia pendula. It can also occur alongside Eucalyptus populnea and Casuarina cristata, but commonly grows independently alongside watercourses in semi-arid areas.

Utilisation and uses 
Acacia stenophylla is rarely utilised by cattle, but it is palatable to sheep. Seeds and pods of Acacia stenophylla were roasted and used by Indigenous Australians as a food source.

The plant is said to contain medicinal alkaloids.

Acacia stenophylla is widely planted as a drought tolerant and decumbent ornamental tree. It is cultivated by plant nurseries, and used in modernist gardens and in public landscapes in the Southwestern United States and California.

Reproduction and dispersal 
Acacia stenophylla normally flowers from March to August, although it can flower irregularly throughout the year. Seed pods turn woody as they mature from October to December and produce approximately 6–12 viable seeds/g.

Acacia stenophylla seeds germinate prolifically. Proceeding major floods, seedlings can often be present along the flood-line, but only a very small proportion of these persist.

Taxonomy 
Acacia stenophylla belongs to the Genus Acacia, comprising 1200 species worldwide. 900 of these species are endemic to Australia.

 Kingdom: Plantae
 Phylum: Charophyta
 Class: Equisetopsida
 Subclass: Magnoliidae
 Superorder: Rosanae
 Order: Fabales
 Family: Fabaceae 
 Genus: Acacia
 Species: Acacia stenophylla

Common names 
Common names used in Australia include Balkura, Belalie, Black Wattle, Dalby Myall, Dalby Wattle, Dunthy, Eumong,  Gooralee, Gurley, Ironwood, Munumula, Native Willow, River Cooba, River Cooba, and River Myall.

Etymology
The specific epithet is derived from the Greek stenos (narrow) and phyllon (leaf) to give “with narrow leaves”.

Gallery

References

External links

 CSIRO Csiro.au: Acacia stenophylla - Australian publication

stenophylla
Fabales of Australia
Trees of Australia
Flora of Victoria (Australia)
Garden plants of Australia
Drought-tolerant trees
Ornamental trees